Prerana Shrimali is a senior dancer of Jaipur Gharana of Kathak. Born in Banswara in Rajasthan, Shrimati Prerana Shrimali was initiated in Kathak dance by Guru Shri Kundan lal Gangani in Jaipur. Later, she was groomed in the art at Kathak Kendra, New Delhi, under the same Guru late Shri Kundan Lal Gangani of the Jaipur gharana. She has also choreographed several productions and has participated in several international dance seminars and conferences. She has also imparted training to young dancers at Gandharva Mahavidyalaya and Shriram Bharatiya Kala Kendra. She has served as Repertory Chief of the Kathak Kendra, Delhi from the year 2007 to 2009, and later served as a senior guru in Kathak kendra Delhi from 2012 to2017. Shrimati Prerna Shrimali has been awarded the Rajasthan Sangeet Natak Akademi Award and the Rashtriya Ekta Award of the Rajiv Gandhi Foundation. Her dance has been featured in the film The Far Pavilions produced by BBC. Shrimati Prerana Shrimali was awarded central Sangeet Natak Akademi Award for the year 2009 by the president of India  for her contribution to Kathak dance. Now she is based in Jaipur, Rajasthan and started her own institute 'KALAAVART' Prerana Shrimali centre of Kathak in 2021.

Awards and honours
 1981 Shringarmani SurSingar Samsad, Bombay
 1986 Kalashri Shri Sangeet Bharti, Bikaner
 1988 YuvaRatna Jaipur Jaycees, Jaipur
 1989 Rajasthan Yuva Ratna Rajasthan Yuvajan Pravaritti Samaj, Jaipur
 1989 Shrikant Verma Rashtriya Puraskaar Bhartiya Kalyan Parishad, New Delhi
 1990 Prashasti Tamrapatra Rajasthan Samaroha, Jaipur
 1993 Rajasthan Sangeet Natak Academy Award Rajasthan Sangeet Natak Academy 
 1996 Adhaarshila Puraskaar Group of Journalists, Writers & Artists, Delhi
 2001 Rashtriya Ekta Award 57th Birth Anniversary of Rajiv Gandhi
 2004 Raza Puraskaar Raza Foundation, Delhi
 2008 Keshav Smriti Award Kaladharmi, Delhi
 2010 10th Vimla Devi Samman Vimla Devi Foundation, Ayodhya

References

External links

Indian female classical dancers
Performers of Indian classical dance
Year of birth missing (living people)
Living people
Kathak exponents
Recipients of the Sangeet Natak Akademi Award